Mount Astor is a prominent peak,  high, standing  north of Mount Bowser in the Hays Mountains of the Queen Maud Mountains. It was discovered by Rear Admiral Richard Evelyn Byrd on the Byrd Antarctic Expedition flight of November 1929 to the South Pole, and named by him for Vincent Astor, contributor to the expedition.

References

Amundsen Coast
Astor family
Mountains of the Ross Dependency
Queen Maud Mountains